Mogo is a sub-prefecture of Chari-Baguirmi Region in Chad.

References 

Populated places in Chad